Microthrissa is a genus of sprats in the herring family, Clupeidae, which is endemic to Africa.  There are five recognized species in the genus.

Species
 Microthrissa congica (Regan, 1917) (Bigscale pellonuline)
 Microthrissa minuta Poll, 1974 (Dungu sprat)
 Microthrissa moeruensis (Poll, 1948) (Lake Mweru sprat)
 Microthrissa royauxi Boulenger, 1902 (Royal sprat)
 Microthrissa whiteheadi Gourène & Teugels, 1988

References
 

Clupeidae
Fish of Africa
Freshwater fish genera
Taxa named by George Albert Boulenger